"Packing Things Up on the Scene" is a song by Brooklyn-based band Radio 4. It was released as the second single from their 2006 album Enemies Like This. A music video was also released, with director Tim Sutton.

Track listing

Mini CD
 Packing Things up on the Scene (Radio Edit)
 Pretty Good Lie

7" vinyl
 Packing Things up on the Scene (Album version)
 Take Anything

12" vinyl
 Packing Things Up On The Scene (The Loving Hand remix)
 Packing Things Up On The Scene (The Loving Hand instrumental)

 All tracks available for download on iTunes.

Music video

The song features a music video, directed by Tim Sutton, in which the band starts playing in a room, among some young people on sofa watching on TV an army incident in the streets of an unspecified city. After, the band members go out to the streets and see a lot of people laid in the floor, like suffering for some wound. They go back to the room they were before, and that young people is also laid in the floor, like fainted. The video ends closing to the TV screen.

References

External links
 Radio 4 Official Website

2006 singles
2006 songs
Astralwerks singles